Väjern is a locality situated in Sotenäs Municipality, Västra Götaland County, Sweden with 688 inhabitants in 2010.

References

External links
 http://www.swengelsk.se/coast/default.html

Populated places in Västra Götaland County
Populated places in Sotenäs Municipality